Saxby may refer to:

People
Saxby (surname)
Saxby Chambliss (born 1943), American Republican Senator

Places
Saxby, Leicestershire
Saxby, Lincolnshire
Saxby All Saints, North Lincolnshire, England
Saxby, Estonia, village in Vormsi Parish, Lääne County, Estonia
Saxbys Coffee, a franchise of coffeehouses
Saxby County, Queensland

Other uses
1869 Saxby Gale, a tropical cyclone which struck eastern Canada's Bay of Fundy
Saxby Bros Ltd, a food manufacture in England
Saxby River, in North West Queensland, Australia